Edmeston is a census-designated place (CDP) forming the central settlement of the town of Edmeston in Otsego County, New York, United States. The population of the CDP was 657 at the 2010 census.

Geography
Edmeston is located at  (42.69177, -75.25326).

Demographics

References

Census-designated places in New York (state)
Census-designated places in Otsego County, New York